Dehkadeh is a village in Tarrah Rural District, Hamidiyeh District, Ahvaz County, Khuzestan Province, Iran. At the 2006 census, its population was 2,592, in 490 families.

References 

Populated places in Ahvaz County